Kenneth, Kenny, or Ken Wagner may refer to:

 Kenny Wagner American 20th century murder
 Kenneth Wagner (racing driver) an American Stock car (NASCAR) driver